PB-23 Awaran is a constituency of the Provincial Assembly of Balochistan.

Election 2013

See also
 PB-22 Lasbela
 PB-24 Gwadar

References

External links
 Election commission Pakistan's official website
 Awazoday.com check result
 Balochistan's Assembly official site

Constituencies of Balochistan